Khoo Cai Lin (born 25 December 1988) is a Malaysian swimmer. She swam for Malaysia at the 2008 and 2012 Olympic Games. At the 2008 Summer Olympics, she competed in the women's 400 and 800 m freestyle.  At the 2012 Summer Olympics, she competed in the Women's 800 metre freestyle, finishing in 30th place  overall in the heats, failing to qualify for the final.

She was awarded the Malaysian Olympian of the Year in 2007.

References

1988 births
Living people
People from Selangor
Olympic swimmers of Malaysia
Swimmers at the 2008 Summer Olympics
Swimmers at the 2012 Summer Olympics
Malaysian female freestyle swimmers
Malaysian sportspeople of Chinese descent
Swimmers at the 2010 Asian Games
Swimmers at the 2014 Asian Games
Commonwealth Games competitors for Malaysia
Swimmers at the 2010 Commonwealth Games
Southeast Asian Games gold medalists for Malaysia
Southeast Asian Games silver medalists for Malaysia
Southeast Asian Games bronze medalists for Malaysia
Southeast Asian Games medalists in swimming
Competitors at the 2007 Southeast Asian Games
Competitors at the 2009 Southeast Asian Games
Competitors at the 2011 Southeast Asian Games
Competitors at the 2013 Southeast Asian Games
Asian Games competitors for Malaysia
Malaysian female butterfly swimmers
21st-century Malaysian women